Hidde ter Avest (born 20 May 1997) is a Dutch professional footballer who plays as a right-back for Eredivisie side FC Utrecht.

Club career
Ter Avest is a product of the FC Twente youth academy. He made his Eerste Divisie debut at 22 August 2014 against Almere City in a 1–0 away win.

International career
Ter Avest was a member of the Netherlands U17 national team beaten on penalties by England in the final of the 2014 UEFA European Under-17 Championship.

Honours
Netherlands U17
 UEFA European Under-17 Championship runners-up: 2014

References

1997 births
Living people
People from Wierden
Dutch footballers
Footballers from Overijssel
Association football fullbacks
Eredivisie players
Eerste Divisie players
Serie A players
FC Twente players
Jong FC Twente players
Udinese Calcio players
FC Utrecht players
Netherlands under-21 international footballers
Netherlands youth international footballers
Dutch expatriate footballers
Dutch expatriate sportspeople in Italy
Expatriate footballers in Italy